James Q. Wedworth (April 14, 1919 – December 22, 1998) served in the California legislature and during World War II he served in the United States Navy.

Personal
He was born on April 14, 1919, in Illinois. He married Muriel Berube and had four children: sons Ronald and Albert and daughters Susan and Diane. He saw military service during World War II.

He a ran an orchard and a horse boarding farm. He was actively involved in the Boy Scouts, Rotary, Little League and Pop Warner football.

Wedworth died in 1998 at age 79.

Career
Wedworth was a California state senator and for nearly 25 years he was mayor of Hawthorne. In 1970, along with assemblyman Larry Townsend, he was responsible for introducing a bill allowing paramedics to save lives in emergency situations. It wasn't until Ronald Reagan—who at the time was governor of California—signed the Wedworth-Townsend Paramedic Act that paramedics were allowed to run calls without nurses attending.

References

External links
Join California James Q. Wedworth

United States Navy personnel of World War II
1919 births
1998 deaths
20th-century American politicians
Democratic Party California state senators